Palais des Sports 80 is a live double album by Dalida, recorded live at the Palais des Sports in Paris in January 1980.

Track listing

Disc one
 "Intro: In the Stone"
 "Je suis toutes les femmes"
 "Pour ne pas vivre seul"
 "Le Lambeth Walk"
 "Comme disait Mistinguett"
 "Alabama Song" (English version)
 "La vie en rose"
 "Quand on n'a que l'amour"
 "Il faut danser reggae"
 "Gigi l'amoroso"
 "Gigi in Paradisco"

Disc two
 "Mon frère le soleil"
 "Avec le temps"
 "Salma ya salama" (Egyptian version)
 "Monday, Tuesday... Laissez-moi danser"
 "Money, Money" (English version)
 "Il venait d'avoir 18 ans"
 "Je suis malade"
 "Ça me fait rêver"

See also
 List of Dalida songs
 Dalida albums discography
 Dalida singles discography

References
 Dalida Official Website

External links
 Dalida Official Website "Discography" section

Dalida albums
1980 live albums